The discography of American rapper Foxy Brown contains three studio albums, one collaborative album, one mixtape, and 16 singles. Brown made her solo debut as a feature on "I Shot Ya" in 1995. Her debut album Ill Na Na released November 19, 1996, became the first female rap album to chart in the Top 10 of Billboard 200 and certified Platinum within three months of its release. Ill Na Na charted in the U.S, Canada, United Kingdom, Switzerland, Germany, France, and the Netherlands. She continued her success with The Firm: The Album in 1997 a collaborative album uniting Nas, Az, and Brown. It became her first #1 album on Billboard 200 and was certified Gold in Canada carrying on her international success. In 1998 she released her first single to her 2nd solo studio album Chyna Doll with "Hot Spot". In January 1999 she released Chyna Doll which became the first solo female rap album to debut at #1 on Billboard 200 landing a spot in the Guinness World Records of 1999. It was certified Platinum within two months by RIAA and became her highest charting album around the world. In July 2001 she released her long awaited third solo studio album Broken Silence which was certified Gold by RIAA. Two years later, "Na Na Be Like" despite being a non single from Broken Silence, became a Grammy nominated song for Best Female Rap Solo Performance. Her albums Ill Na Na 2: The Fever set to release in 2003 and Black Roses set to release in 2005 were shelved. In 2007 she was sentenced to prison in Rikers Island. During this time her mixtape Brooklyn's Don Diva was released.

Albums

Studio albums

Collaborative album

Mixtapes

Compilation Album

Singles

As lead artist

As featured performer

Music Videos

Guest appearances

References

Discography
Hip hop discographies
Discographies of American artists